Banksia leptophylla var. melletica is a variety of Banksia leptophylla. It is native to the Southwest Botanical Province of Western Australia.

References
 
 
 

leptophylla var. melletica
Eudicots of Western Australia